Something from Nothing may refer to:

Science and philosophy
Ex nihilo, a Latin phrase meaning "out of nothing", which often appears in conjunction with the concept of creation

Music
Something from Nothing, a 1971 bootleg recording by Pink Floyd
"Something from Nothing" (song), a 2014 single by Foo Fighters
"Something from Nothing", a 2010 song by Danish singer-songwriter Aura Dione

Film
Something from Nothing: The Art of Rap, a 2012 documentary about rap music

Books
Something from Nothing, a 1992 children's book by Phoebe Gilman
Joseph Had a Little Overcoat, a 1999 children's book by Simms Taback which features the phrase

See also
 Nothing from Nothing (disambiguation)
 Something for Nothing (disambiguation)